Jack's Magazine (also known as the Saltwater River Gunpowder Magazine) is located on the Maribyrnong River at Maribyrnong, Victoria. The complex opened in 1878, to provide safe storage for bonded gunpowder and explosives imported into the colony of Victoria. The twin bluestone vaulted buildings are concealed behind high earth mound blast walls, and a tall bluestone wall, with a canal connecting it to the river. It was designed by government architect, William Wardell, Inspector General, Public Works Department and built by contractor George Cornwell.

It is registered by the National Trust, and listed on the Victorian Heritage Register. The associated Footscray Ammunition Factory was mostly demolished and redeveloped for the Delfin Lend Lease Corporation's Edgewater estate. Jack's Magazine was proposed to be redeveloped for a commercial use, but following several calls for expressions of interests it was decided that public ownership was the only practical management for the historic site. Jack's Magazine is now managed by Working Heritage – a committee appointed by the Victorian Government to manage heritage properties on Crown Land. In an interview on the SBS the local Peter Haffenden asserted that, from Jack's Magazine, "all the bullets, all the .303s bullets used in Gallipoli, in Egypt, in the Somme, in Amiens" were all made by the munition company, whose main factory was based at Jack's Magazine.

References

1878 establishments in Australia
Gunpowder magazines
Heritage-listed buildings in Melbourne
Buildings and structures completed in 1878
1993 disestablishments in Australia
Buildings and structures in the City of Maribyrnong